Geoffrey William Ainsworth (27 May 1946 – 2 February 2011) was an Australian rules footballer who played with Geelong in the Victorian Football League (VFL) during the late 1960s and early 1970s.

The son of a local lawyer, William Charles Ainsworth, Geoff matriculated to the University of Melbourne in 1965, where he was resident at Trinity College. He represented the college in tennis, athletics, cricket and football, and also played football with the University Blues, where he was noticed by the senior teams.

Ainsworth played in jersey no. 25 with Geelong, who used him as a defender in the back pocket over the course of his eight-season career. He was a member of Geelong's losing 1967 VFL Grand Final side in his first year at the club. After missing all but one game of the 1971 season as he was travelling in Europe, Ainsworth went on to become club captain in 1973. He lost the captaincy role the following season and retired, aged only 28, at the end of the year in order to concentrate on his legal career. During his career Ainsworth had polled a total of five Brownlow Medal votes. In 1976 he was made a life member of the Geelong Football Club. Ainsworth died on 2 February 2011.

References

Holmesby, Russell and Main, Jim (2007). The Encyclopedia of AFL Footballers. 7th ed. Melbourne: Bas Publishing.

External links

Australian rules footballers from Victoria (Australia)
Geelong Football Club players
Geelong Football Club captains
People educated at Trinity College (University of Melbourne)
University Blues Football Club players
1946 births
2011 deaths
Deaths from cancer in Victoria (Australia)